Eckardt is a surname, and may refer to:

Adelaide C. Eckardt, American politician
A. Roy Eckardt, American theologian and Methodist minister
Felix von Eckardt, German politician
Heinrich von Eckardt, German diplomat
Jason Eckardt, American composer
Katrin Göring-Eckardt, German politician
Peter Eckardt, German politician
René Eckardt, German football player
Ulrich Eckardt, German author 
Marcel Eckardt, German snooker and pool referee.

See also
Eckart
Eckerd (disambiguation)
Eckhart (disambiguation)
Ekkehard